Jack O'Connor (born 24 January 1957) is an Irish trade unionist who has served as Chairman of the Labour Party since April 2017. He previously served as General President of SIPTU from 2003 to 2017 and President of ICTU from 2009 to 2011.

Background
Born in northern County Dublin, O'Connor worked in various fields before taking full-time employment with the Federated Workers' Union of Ireland in 1980.  In 1990, the union became part of SIPTU, and O'Connor was appointed as its regional organiser for the Midlands.

Trade Unionism
In 2000, O'Connor became Vice President of SIPTU, and in 2003 he was elected as General President. O'Connor stepped down as General President on 14 December 2017 after completing three terms in the role.

He was appointed to the executive of the Irish Congress of Trade Unions in 2001, becoming Vice President in 2007 and President in 2009.  He is also active in the Labour Party and has served on its executive.

Labour Party activities
At the 2017 Labour Party annual Conference, O'Connor was elected as Party Chairperson, succeeding fellow SIPTU official Lorainne Mulligan.  O'Connor was elected unopposed.

On 4 April 2018, O'Connor was selected as the party's general election candidate for Wicklow, however he stepped down as the candidate in September 2019, upon which Paul O'Brien was selected to run instead.

References

1957 births
Living people
People from County Dublin
Irish trade unionists
Presidents of the Irish Congress of Trade Unions